Pálmi Rafn Pálmason (born 9 November 1984) is an Icelandic footballer who is currently playing for KR in the Icelandic Premier Division. Before that he played in Iceland for Völsungur, KA and Valur, where he was a key player in the team that won the 2007 Úrvalsdeild, Valur's first league title in 20 years.

He was signed by Stabæk in July 2008 and became one of the heroes for them in the 2008-season when he headed in the 2–1 goal in overtime against the current league champions Brann at Brann Stadion and practically secured Stabæk's first league gold ever. This was his first league goal for Stabæk.

Pálmason made his debut for the Icelandic national team in a friendly against Belarus in February 2008. He's been a regular member of the squad under former coach Ólafur Jóhannesson

Career statistics

Club

References

External links
Palmi Rafn Palmason at Melar Sport homepage
Official homepage of Palmi Rafn Palmason on Facebook

1984 births
Living people
Palmi Rafn Palmason
Palmi Rafn Palmason
Palmi Rafn Palmason
Palmi Rafn Palmason
Knattspyrnufélag Akureyrar players
Palmi Rafn Palmason
Palmi Rafn Palmason
Palmi Rafn Palmason
Stabæk Fotball players
Lillestrøm SK players
Eliteserien players
Expatriate footballers in Norway
Palmi Rafn Palmason
Icelandic expatriate sportspeople in Norway
Association football midfielders